Jacques Désiré Leandri, born 1903 in Corsica, died 1982, was a French botanist and mycologist.

Leandri is remembered for botanical excursions in North Africa (Morocco) and Madagascar. He collected plants for scientific study from the years 1922 to 1980. The plant genus Leandriella from the family Acanthaceae is named after him. As a taxonomist, he circumscribed many plants within the family Euphorbiaceae.

Publications 
 Les arbres et grands arbustes Malgaches de la famille des Euphorbiaceaes. Naturaliste Malgache 4: 47–82 (1952)
 Les Euphorbes Malgaches Epineuses et Charnues du Jardin Botanique de Tsimbazaz, 144–154 (1954) with E. Ursch
 Un Naturaliste du Muséum a la Recherche des Quinquinas: Hugh Algernon Weddell (1819–1877) Adansonia 6: 165–173 (1966)

References 

 List of published works copied from an equivalent article at the Spanish Wikipedia.

External links
 [PDF]Site du patrimoine mondial des Tsingy de Bemaraha et autres sites (in French)

20th-century French botanists
French mycologists
1903 births
1982 deaths